Beaconhill is a housing estate in Northumberland, in England. It is in the west of Cramlington, north of Newcastle upon Tyne. It is served by a primary school.

References

Villages in Northumberland
Cramlington